The "Forgotten Widows" are a group of women who were barred from receiving any compensation after the death of their United States Military spouses. As a result of the Survivor Benefit Plan being passed in the late 1970s, spouses of servicemembers who died before the act was put into effect were cut off from receiving any aid from the military.

The Department of Defense has repealed certain statutes barring the Forgotten Widows, a vocal minority in recent years, from receiving compensation. In 2001, the DoD allowed widows of servicemembers who retired from active service before September 21, 1972, and died before March 21, 1974, to receive a monthly stipend, on the condition that the widow has not remarried. Any spouses of armed forces reserve members who died before October 1, 1978, are also eligible.

The number of Forgotten Widows still alive is estimated to be in the thousands. Nearly 800 widows applied for compensation upon the relaxing of the Benefit Plan rules in 2001, with 550 applications approved.

References

United States military policies
Widowhood in the United States
Women in the United States military